Tatosoma fasciata is a species of moth in the family Geometridae first described by Alfred Philpott in 1914. It is endemic to New Zealand. This moth has been observed at Mount Te Aroha, which is possibly the northern most location this species is found. The larval host plant of this species is Lophozonia menziesii.

References

Trichopterygini
Moths described in 1914
Moths of New Zealand
Endemic fauna of New Zealand
Taxa named by Alfred Philpott
Endemic moths of New Zealand